Stizomolpus is a genus of leaf beetles in the subfamily Eumolpinae. It contains only one species, Stizomolpus kebarus. It is distributed in New Guinea. The name of the genus refers to the strong punctures (of the pronotum and elytra) and "eumolpine beetle".

References

Eumolpinae
Monotypic Chrysomelidae genera
Beetles of Oceania
Insects of New Guinea
Endemic fauna of New Guinea